Whitton United F.C. is an English football club based in the Whitton area of Ipswich, Suffolk.

The club is affiliated to the Suffolk County FA.

History
Although a Whitton United existed in the late 19th century, the modern club was established in 1926 and initially played on a pitch behind the Whitton Crown pub. They won the Suffolk Minor Cup 2–0 in their first season. After two seasons they moved to another ground behind the Whitton Maypole pub, and later to the King George V Playing Fields.

The club won the Senior Division of the Ipswich & District League in 1946–47 and again in 1947–48, when they also reached the final of the Suffolk Senior Cup, but lost the final at Portman Road 3–1 to Lowestoft Town in front of over 8,000 supporters. In 1959 they won the cup, beating Bungay Town 3–0, and retained it the following season, again beating Bungay 3–0.

They won the Senior Division again in 1965–66 and 1967–68, but then switched to the Essex & Suffolk Border League. After struggling during the 1970s, they were relegated and dropped into Division Two of the Ipswich & District League. In the late 1980s and early 1990s the club won Division Two and Division One to return to the Senior Division. In 1992 they won the Suffolk Senior Cup for a third time, beating Long Melford 2–0, and the following season won the Senior Division. After winning it again in 1994–95 the club were promoted to Division One of the Eastern Counties League.

Former Plymouth player Ronnie Mauge joined the club as manager in 2005, but resigned in 2007. In 2007–08 they finished third in the league and were promoted to the Premier Division. However, in early January 2009 the club that they would be unable to fulfil their first team fixtures and would be withdrawing from the league. Despite their withdrawal, the club rejoined the league in Division One the following season, with Ian Brown appointed manager. In 2010–11 they won the Senior Cup again, defeating Lakenheath 1–0 in the final. They also finished second in the league, but were not promoted due to ground grading issues. The following season the club retained the Senior Cup with a 2–1 win over Long Melford. In 2013–14 they were promoted to the Premier Division after winning the Division One title. However, they were relegated back to Division One after finishing bottom of the division in 2015–16.

Honours
Eastern Counties League
Division One Champions 2013–14
Suffolk & Ipswich League
Senior Division champions 1946–47, 1947–48, 1965–66, 1967–68, 1992–93, 1994–95
League Cup winners 1994
Suffolk Senior Cup
Winners 1959, 1960, 1992, 2011, 2012

Club records
Highest league position: 11th in Eastern Counties League Premier Division, 2014–15
Best FA Cup performance: Second qualifying round, 1951–52, 1953–54, 1957–58, 1958–59  
Best FA Vase performance: Second round, 2010–11, 2011–12
Attendance: 528 vs Ipswich Town, 29 November 1995

Notable former players
Former professional footballers who have played for Whitton include:
Ian Brown (2005–2007)
Ronnie Mauge (2004–2006)

References

External links
Club website

 
Association football clubs established in 1926
Football clubs in England
Sport in Ipswich
Eastern Counties Football League
1926 establishments in England
Football clubs in Suffolk